Saud Alhogbani (born 15 January 2003) is a Saudi Arabian tennis player.

Career

Alhogbani represents Saudi Arabia at the Davis Cup, where he has a W/L record of 8–9.

Alhogbani was a promising junior tennis player, winning multiple USTA junior tennis tournaments.

Personal life
Alhogbani grew up in Alexandria, Virginia with seven siblings.

References

External links

2003 births
Living people
Saudi Arabian male tennis players
Sportspeople from Alexandria, Virginia